Table Bay (Afrikaans: Tafelbaai) is a natural bay on the Atlantic Ocean overlooked by Cape Town (founded 1652 by Van Riebeeck) and is at the northern end of the Cape Peninsula, which stretches south to the Cape of Good Hope. It was named because it is dominated by the flat-topped Table Mountain.

History
Bartolomeu Dias was the first European to explore this region in 1486. The bay, although famous for centuries as a haven for ships, is actually a rather poor natural harbour and is exposed to storm waves from the northwest. Many sailing ships seeking refuge in the bay during the 17th and 18th centuries were driven ashore by winter storms.

The Dutch colonists nevertheless persisted with their efforts on the shores of Table Bay, because good natural harbours along this coastline are almost non-existent. The best of them, Saldanha Bay, lacked fresh water. Simon's Bay was well protected from westerly winter storms and swells, but more exposed to summer southeasterliy storms and difficult to access overland from Cape Town. Hout Bay was small and exposed to the prevailing southwesterly swell. Eventually a harbour was built in Table Bay by a process of land reclamation and was protected from storm waves by breakwaters. The older part of this development is called the Victoria Dock; the newer part, the Duncan Dock. Robben Island, where Nelson Mandela was imprisoned for decades, is in this bay.

The bay's beaches were oiled following an accident involving the Dutch tanker Sliedrecht in November 1953.

Image gallery

See also
 False Bay
 Eduard Bohlen

References

 

Bays of South Africa
Maritime history of South Africa